Winchester Courthouse Square Historic District is a national historic district located at Winchester, Randolph County, Indiana.  The district encompasses 52 contributing buildings and 10 contributing structures in the central business district of Winchester.  The district developed between about 1875 and 1950 and includes notable examples of Italianate, Romanesque Revival, and Classical Revival style architecture.  Notable buildings include the Randolph County Courthouse (1875), U.S. Post Office (1932), I.O.O.F. Hall (c. 1875), Winchester Community Library (1906), Masonic Lodge (c. 1925), Randolph Hotel (c. 1910), David Building (1927), and W.E. Miller Department Store (1883).  Notable structures include the "Spirit of the Doughboy" monument (1928), Lamp of Freedom (c. 1950), Soldiers and Sailors monument (1892), and Laredo Taft Marker (c. 1936).

It was added to the National Register of Historic Places in 2001.

References

County courthouses in Indiana
Historic districts on the National Register of Historic Places in Indiana
Courthouses on the National Register of Historic Places in Indiana
Neoclassical architecture in Indiana
Romanesque Revival architecture in Indiana
Italianate architecture in Indiana
Historic districts in Randolph County, Indiana
National Register of Historic Places in Randolph County, Indiana
Winchester, Indiana